The Boy Who Cried Werewolf is a 1973 Technicolor horror film directed by Nathan H. Juran. The film stars Kerwin Mathews in the final film he and Juran made after their earlier work, which included The 7th Voyage of Sinbad. In this thriller, a boy visits his father in a secluded cabin; the father is attacked by a werewolf and then becomes one himself. The boy constantly tries to tell others, but no one will believe him.

Juran came out of retirement to make the film as a favour to producer Aaron Rosenberg.

Plot

Robert Bridgestone (Kerwin Mathews), a divorced father, takes his son Richie (Scott Sealey) to the family mountain cabin. During a moonlight hike, the two are attacked in the darkness by a werewolf. During the struggle, the werewolf falls into a ravine and is impaled on a wooden fence, but not before biting Robert. Upon investigation, they find their attacker to be human. Unable to identify the body, the local sheriff concludes their attacker was a crazy drifter. Richie insists it was a werewolf, but his father and the sheriff laugh it off as childish imagination.

Concerned with Richie's story, Sandy (Elaine Devry) insists her ex-husband talk with her son's psychiatrist. The psychiatrist (George Gaynes) says that Richie's werewolf fixation stems from his inability to accept that his father killed a man and instead has concocted a fantasy wherein his father bravely battles a monster. He suggests Robert take his son back to the cabin, predicting that when Richie returns to the scene and sees that everything is normal, his interest in werewolves will cease.

Returning to the cabin during another full moon, Robert experiences a wave of pain and sends Richie off to the stream. As he watches in a mirror, Robert changes into a duplicate of the creature he had killed. When Richie sees what is apparently the same werewolf resurrected, he flees to the woods, crossing a mountain road. The werewolf pursues, causing vehicles to crash. One driver is then dismembered by the creature. Richie comes upon two newlyweds camping. While they do not believe the boy's story, they see his distress and agree to take him home. Arriving at the cabin, Richie's father is nowhere to be seen, and Richie begs the man to let him return with him to the camper for the night. The next morning Robert, appearing dazed and confused, shows up at the camper and tells the couple he has been searching for Richie all night. Richie tells his father about the werewolf, but Robert is clearly losing patience with his son's fantasies.

During the following night's full moon, Robert transforms and searches through the house for Richie who, in anticipation, has hidden himself. The werewolf then seeks out the newlyweds, pushing their camper down a hill. He mutilates their bodies, carrying away one of the heads. Returning to the cabin's shed just before daybreak, he digs a hole to bury the head. Richie, hearing noises, sneaks down to the shed and witnesses the werewolf's changing back into his father. Moments later, the sheriff arrives to report on the previous killings, convinced of a connection between the attacks. On the drive home, Richie questions his father about his actions, but Robert dismisses everything, clearly irritable and bothered about his memory blackout. Richie jumps hurriedly out of the car upon arriving at his mother's, telling her that he is scared to be alone with his father, because his father is a monster.

Sandy talks with Robert about their son's fears and how Richie thinks Robert is a werewolf. It is agreed that another visit with the psychiatrist is in order. The doctor tells Robert that Richie genuinely believes that Robert is a werewolf, and that these type of fantasies can be quite powerful for children. The doctor tells Robert that werewolf victims suffer from amnesia and their hands will become deformed the longer they are infected. As their session goes on, the full moon rises and Robert kills the doctor. Meanwhile, Sandy tells Richie this time she will go with him and Robert for a family weekend.

The next day, a reluctant Richie and his mom prepare to leave for the cabin with Robert, unaware that the headline of the morning paper reads "Local Psychiatrist Murdered". The three set out for the cabin, stopping at a hippie commune on the way. The hippies, with their wild-eyed leader (Bob Homel), are forming a circle of power to drive away evil spirits. When the family stop to watch, the hippies shout at them to join in, and while an amused Sandy agrees, when Robert tries to enter the circle, he is stopped short and cannot move further, as if an invisible barrier were before him. A disturbed Sandy grabs him and they get back in the car and continue to the cabin, where they settle down for the evening. Sandy talks gently with Robert, confessing that she has really missed him and that perhaps they should get back together.

The full moon rises, and Robert turns his back on her, silently walking away. In the shed he finds Richie, digging up the bag he had seen his father (in werewolf form) burying on their previous visit. Robert grabs Richie, clearly in the first stages of transformation, and begs Richie to lock him in the shed. Richie does so, but as he finishes, his mother sees him and hears the noises in the shed. Richie tells her it is his dad in there, whereupon she scolds Richie and tries to open the shed. Richie screams at her just as a clawed hand bursts through the door. Richie and his mother run to the car, escaping just as the werewolf emerges, screaming and snarling. The werewolf attacks the hippie commune and as the sun rises, the werewolf weakens and collapses. The hippies witness the beast's transformation back into Robert, and though not understanding what they are seeing, they pray for the creature's soul. Upon regaining consciousness, Robert flees into the woods.

Richie and his mother seek help from the sheriff, but upon returning to the cabin they find the creature gone. The Sheriff leaves some men to stand guard, while Robert watches from the woods and sees that his index finger has now become deformed. Later that evening, as Sandy sleeps by the fire, the werewolf slips silently through a cabin window. Sandy awakes to find it staring her in the face. It starts to carry her off, but on hearing her screams, the deputies burst in, opening fire as the monster jumps out the window. Richie begs for them not to hurt his dad, but of course everyone still cannot accept that it is a werewolf, let alone Richie's father.

That evening, as the sheriff organizes a search party, Richie breaks away and heads off to try to save his father. As the moon rises, Richie finds his father, once again transformed, who grabs him and carries him off, with the mob close behind. Cornered, the werewolf attacks Richie, biting him on the arm, before a hail of gunfire distracts him. The bullets cannot kill him, but frantically attempting to flee, he stumbles and falls on the broken stake that held the hippies' cross to the ground. It pierces his heart, a method as to kill vampires , and as a horrified Richie and Sandy watch, the werewolf transforms back into Robert. The last thing we see is Sandy examining her son's bite mark, with dawning horror on her face (implying that Richie will be cursed to become a werewolf now).

Cast
 Kerwin Mathews as Robert Bridgestone
 Elaine Devry as Sandy Bridgestone
 Scott Sealey as Richie Bridgestone
 Robert J. Wilke as the Sheriff
 Susan Foster as Jenny
 Jack Lucas as Harry
 Bob Homel as Brother Christopher
 George Gaynes as Dr. Marderosian
 Loretta Temple as Monica
 David S. Cass Sr. as Deputy (as Dave Cass)
 Harold Goodwin as Mr. Duncan
 Tim Haldeman as First Guard
 John Logan as Second Guard
 Eric Gordon as Hippy 'Jesus Freak'
 Paul Baxley as First Werewolf

Critical reception
The New York Times wrote, "Skip The Boy Who Cried Werewolf, the standard, slapdash half of a new horror double bill that includes something called Sssssss (as in snake). There is some amusing business in Werewolf toward the end, as the thrashing werewolf (Kerwin Mathews) tangles with a bunch of Jesus Freaks. Bob Homel, who plays the leader, also wrote the picture."

References

External links
 
 
 
 

1973 films
1973 horror films
Films directed by Nathan Juran
Universal Pictures films
American werewolf films
Universal Monsters
1970s English-language films
1970s American films